Linde Merckpoel (born 17 October 1984) is a Belgian vlogger and radio presenter. She was a vlogger for the Flemish public television channel Eén and a radio presenter for the Flemish radio station Studio Brussel where she was a figurehead for years.

Biography
She was born in Hamme and grew up in Eksaare (Lokeren). Her career at VRT radio started in July 2007 at the VRT news service as a newsreader at Studio Brussel and Radio Donna. From September 2008 she became active at Studio Brussel as a radio presenter.

In the fall of 2013 she had her own late evening program on Studio Brussel: Linde Late Night, airing between 10 pm and midnight. In December she was one of the three presenters of Music for Life 2013 (Music For Life 2013). From 6 January 2014 she presented the evening program Linde Live with Joris Lenaerts as her sidekick.

During the 2015-2016 radio season, she presented the At Your Service program on Studio Brussel.

From the 2016-2017 radio season, she presented Linde Staat Op every working day morning from 6 to 9 am. She was assisted in the first two seasons by sidekick Bram Willems, and from September 2018 by Jonas Decleer.

References

1984 births
Living people
Belgian radio presenters
Belgian women radio presenters
People from Lokeren
People from Hamme